Joe Clair (born February 13, 1969), also known by the nickname "Joe Cleezy", is an American stand-up comedian, radio personality, VJ and actor. A native of the Seat Pleasant, Maryland suburb of Washington, D.C., Clair is best known as a former host of BET's Rap City from 1994 to 1999. He hosted his own morning drive time show on WPGC-FM in Washington, D.C. from 5:50am-10am.

Clair earned a bachelor's degree in psychology from Morgan State University in Baltimore, Maryland.  Aside from his work as host of Rap City, Clair has also hosted several radio shows and appeared on the stand-up comedy shows Def Comedy Jam and ComicView. Clair was named morning drive time host at WPGC-FM in his hometown of Washington, D.C. in February 2015 to July 2021.

As an actor, Clair has appeared in several films, most notably the 1992 horror film Ax 'Em, where he plays the role of Tony.

References

External links
JoeClair.com - official website

African-American stand-up comedians
American stand-up comedians
African-American television personalities
American radio personalities
Living people
People from Seat Pleasant, Maryland
Place of birth missing (living people)
1967 births
21st-century American comedians
21st-century African-American people
20th-century African-American people